Thomas Smeaton may refer to:

 Thomas Smeton (1536–1583), or Smeaton, Scottish minister and principal of Glasgow University
 Thomas Drury Smeaton (1831–1908), banker and amateur scientist in the British colony of South Australia
 Thomas Hyland Smeaton (1857–1927), Australian politician and trade unionist